Cyperus clarkei is a species of sedge that is native to parts of Asia.

See also 
 List of Cyperus species

References 

clarkei
Plants described in 1908
Flora of Vietnam
Flora of India
Flora of Sri Lanka